Quintet (stylized as QUINTET) is a 5-on-5, winner stays on, Japanese grappling promotion created by mixed martial arts legend Kazushi Sakuraba. Quintet is broadcast on UFC Fight Pass. Sakuraba developed Quintet with friend and former UFC champion Josh Barnett. In July 2017, Sakuraba visited Las Vegas to attend the ceremony honoring his induction into the UFC Hall of Fame. While in Las Vegas, Sakuraba pitched the concept of Quintet to Ant Evans, the content officer for UFC Fight Pass. Evans loved the idea and worked with Sakuraba to further develop the concept before ultimately signing Quintet to a long-term deal with UFC Fight Pass.

Rules

Fight Mat
In Quitntet, bouts take place on a 12 meter by 12 meter square wrestling mat with no line boundaries. If the fighters move too close to the edge of the mat, the referee stops the bout and restarts it in a safe area of the mat with the fighters assuming the same positions they were in when the bout was stopped.

Winner Stays On System 
The match begins with a bout between two fighters, one from each team. The winner fights the next fighter from the opposing team. If the bout ends in a draw, both fighters are removed and the next fighter from each team enters the mat to grapple. If the last fighter on a team loses their bout, that team loses. If a bout between both teams’ last fighters ends in a draw, the winner of the match is whichever team has the fewest cumulative penalties throughout all the bouts. If both teams have an equal number of penalties, the referees determine the winning team based on which fighter in the final bout was most aggressive.

Weight
The total weight of all five fighters on a team must be below the weight class limit as measured one day before the event.

Time Limits
Each bout consists of one 8-minute round if the fighters are close in weight. If the difference in the fighters’ weights is more than 20kg in the Regular class or 10kg in the Lightweight class, the lighter fighter may choose between an 8- or 4-minute round.

List of Winners

List of events

Quintet 1

Quintet 1 was a team grappling event held by Quintet on April 11, 2018, at the Ryōgoku Kokugikan in Tokyo, Japan.

Teams

Quintet 1 Bracket

Quintet Fight Night 1

Quintet Fight Night 1 was a team grappling survival event held by Quintet on June 9, 2018, at the Differ Ariake in Tokyo, Japan.

Teams

Quintet Fight Night 1 Bracket

Quintet 2

Quintet 2 was a team grappling event held by Quintet on July 16, 2018, at the Ota City General Gymnasium in Tokyo, Japan.

Teams

Quintet 2 Bracket

Quintet 3

Quintet 3 was a team grappling survival event held by Quintet on October 5, 2018, at the Orleans Arena in Las Vegas, USA.

Teams

Super Matches

Quintet 3 Bracket

Quintet Fight Night 2

Quintet Fight Night 2 was a team grappling survival event held by Quintet on February 3, 2019, at the Arena Tachikawa Tachihi in Tokyo, Japan.

Teams

Quintet Fight Night 2 Bracket

Quintet Fight Night 3

Quintet Fight Night 3 was a team grappling survival event held by Quintet on April 7, 2019, at the Arena Tachikawa Tachihi in Tokyo, Japan. It was the first Quintet event to feature women's grappling.

Teams

Quintet Fight Night 3 Bracket

Quintet Fight Night 4

Quintet Fight Night 4 was a team grappling survival event held by Quintet on November 30, 2019, at the Akita City Cultural Center in Akita, Japan.

Teams

Quintet Fight Night 4 Bracket

Quintet Ultra

Quintet Ultra was a team grappling survival event held by Quintet on December 12, 2019, at the Red Rock Casino in Las Vegas, USA. This event was based around teams representing four of the most notable MMA promotions: the UFC, Pride Fighting Championships, Strikeforce and World Extreme Cagefighting. Combatants were chosen based on how closely linked their careers were to those promotions.

Teams

Quintet Ultra bracket

Super Matches

Quintet Fight Night 5

Quintet Fight Night 5 was a team grappling survival event held by Quintet on October 27, 2020, at the Korakuen Hall in Tokyo, Japan.

Teams

Quintet Fight Night 5 Bracket

Quintet Fight Night 6

Quintet Fight Night 6 was a team grappling survival event held by Quintet on March 12, 2021, at the Ex Theater Roppongi in Tokyo, Japan.

Teams

Quintet Fight Night 6 Bracket

Quintet Fight Night 7

Quintet Fight Night 7 was a lightweight team grappling survival event held by Quintet on July 13, 2021, at the Korakuen Hall in Tokyo, Japan.

Teams

Quintet Fight Night 7 Bracket

References

External links

Grappling competitions
2018 establishments in Japan
Sports leagues established in 2018